The Anne Frank Educational Centre (German: Bildungsstätte Anne Frank) was founded in 1997 and is located in the neighbourhood of Dornbusch, Frankfurt am Main in Germany where Anne Frank was born. The Centre is supported by the Anne-Frank-Fonds in Basel. In their work, the Centre uses the biography and the diary of Anne Frank as a unique tool to promote tolerance and educate people about the consequences of Nazism, discrimination and racism.

History 
As early as 1950, Anne Frank's father Otto wanted to found an educational centre in Anne's name. However, it took over 40 years for his wish to become reality. In 1994 the "Jugendbegegnungsstätte Anne Frank e.V." society was founded. On 15 June 1997 the Anne Frank Educational Centre was opened, in the former "Haus der Jugend" (Youth Club/Hostel), near to Anne's former home. In 2003 the new multimedia exhibition "Anne Frank: A Girl from Germany" was opened. The exhibition was developed and produced in cooperation with the Anne Frank House (Amsterdam) and the Anne Frank Zentrum (Berlin).

Exhibition 
Since 2003, adults and young people have had the opportunity to explore the permanent multimedia exhibition “Anne Frank: A Girl from Germany”, guided by their own interest. Visitors have the opportunity to unravel the individual stories within the broader history of National Socialism.

Other activities 
A further focal point of the Centre’s work is human rights education and facilitating dialogue between people from different backgrounds, social statuses and lifestyles. Additionally, they offer seminars, training courses and projects on related topics.

See also
International Youth Meeting Center in Oświęcim/Auschwitz. An independent youth educational center with related goals.
International Youth Meeting Centre in Krzyżowa. A second youth meeting center in Poland that is devoted to dialogue and reconciliation between Poland and Germany.  The Centre was founded after an historic 1989 meeting of Polish Prime Minister Tadeusz Mazowiecki and the German Federal Chancellor Helmut Kohl.

External links 
 

Anti-racist organizations in Europe
Anne Frank
Frankfurt